The U.S. Senate Agriculture Subcommittee on Livestock, Dairy, Poultry, Local Food Systems, and Food Safety and Security is one of five subcommittees of the Senate Committee on Agriculture, Nutrition, and Forestry. 

This subcommittee has jurisdiction over legislation on foreign agricultural trade, foreign market development, as well as agriculture product promotion and domestic marketing programs. It oversees international commodity agreements and export controls on agricultural commodities, foreign assistance programs and Food for Peace, marketing orders, inspection and certification of meat, flowers, fruit, vegetables and livestock.

Name changes

The subcommittee was renamed for the 117th United States Congress (2021).
It was previously:
115th–116th Congresses: Subcommittee on Livestock, Marketing and Agriculture Security
112th–114th Congresses: Subcommittee on Livestock, Dairy, Poultry, Marketing and Agriculture Security
Prior to 112th Congress: Subcommittee on Domestic and Foreign Marketing, Inspection, and Plant and Animal Health.

Members, 118th Congress

References
Senate Agriculture Committee, Subcommittee Page

Agriculture Marketing, Inspection, and Product Promotion
Dairy farming in the United States
Poultry organizations
Agricultural marketing in the United States